Trisunius is a genus of rove beetles.

References

External links 
 iNaturalist

Staphylinidae genera
Paederinae